Fischbach is a German-origin surname. Notable people with the surname include:

Adolf Fischbach (1920–1972), Oberleutnant in the Luftwaffe during World War II
Claudia Fischbach, German biophysicist
Dan Fishbach, American theatre director/producer
Flora Fishbach (born 1991), French singer, songwriter
Friedrich Fischbach (1839–1908), German textile designer
Gerald Fischbach (born 1938), American neuroscientist
Greg Fischbach, founder of video game publisher Acclaim Entertainment
Johann Fischbach, (1797–1871), Austrian painter
Johannes Fischbach (born 1988), German mountain biker
Marc Fischbach (born 1946), Luxembourg politician
Mark Edward Fischbach (born 1989), American YouTuber known as "Markiplier"
Marcel Fischbach (1914–1980), Luxembourg politician, journalist, and diplomat
Michael Fischbach (born 1980), American chemist, microbiologist, and geneticist
Michelle Fischbach (born 1965), Minnesota politician
Oskar Georg Fischbach (1880–1967), German lawyer
Peter Fishbach (born 1947), American tennis player
Stephen Fishbach (born 1979), People Magazine blogger and Survivor contestant